Pisgah View State Park is a developing  North Carolina state park in Buncombe and Haywood Counties, North Carolina, in the United States.  The center piece of the park is the approximately  Pisgah View Ranch, which has rental cabins, equestrian trails, a swimming pool, tennis courts and other amenities.  The ranch has been privately owned by the Cogburn Family since the late 1700s, and the state acquired an option to purchase the property over a five-year period.  The Southern Appalachian Highlands Conservancy has raised $1 million to aid with the purchase.  The Cogburns will donate a portion of the land's value to the state.

History
The North Carolina General Assembly authorized Pisgah View State Park on July 19, 2019.  The first  tract of the park was acquired in 2020.

Nearby state parks
The following state parks and state forests are within  of Pisgah View State Park:
Caesars Head State Park (South Carolina)
Chimney Rock State Park (North Carolina)
DuPont State Forest (North Carolina)
Gorges State Park (North Carolina)
Holmes Educational State Forest (North Carolina)
Horsepasture State Natural River (North Carolina)
Jones Gap State Park (South Carolina)
Mount Mitchell State Park (North Carolina)
Table Rock State Park (South Carolina)

References

External links

State parks of North Carolina
State parks of the Appalachians
Protected areas of Buncombe County, North Carolina
Protected areas of Haywood County, North Carolina
Protected areas established in 2019